Lisa LoCicero (born April 18, 1970) is an American actress, known for her role as Sonia Toledo in ABC soap opera One Life to Live and Olivia Falconeri in another ABC soap opera General Hospital.

Career
Her first notable role was Jocelyn Roberts Brown on the ABC daytime soap opera Loving in 1995. LoCicero stayed with the series when it was spun off as The City, and remained until its cancellation in 1997. She next appeared in small roles in the films The Family Man (2000) and Rush Hour 2 (2001). LoCicero played Miral Paris in the 2001 series finale of Star Trek: Voyager, as well as the recurring role of Nina Shaw on the sitcom Raising Dad in 2002. Her role in the 2004's After the Sunset was cut from the final version of the film.

LoCicero appeared as reporter Maria Storm on the comedy series Reno 911! in September 2004. Around this time she auditioned for the character Lois Cerullo on General Hospital, and was offered the recurring role of Kathryn Fitzgerald on One Life to Live. With her family in Los Angeles and One Life to Live taped in New York City, LoCicero declined. When One Life to Live executive producer Frank Valentini later offered LoCicero the contract role of Sonia Toledo, she accepted it. However, after head writer Michael Malone was replaced by Dena Higley in late 2004, LoCicero and fellow cast member Javier Morga (Tico Santi) were written off the series.
2006 films Invasión robótica
In 2008, LoCicero appeared on It's Always Sunny in Philadelphia. She next began portraying the role of Olivia Falconeri on General Hospital in September 2008. In 2011, she appeared on Rizzoli & Isles as a murder suspect.

Personal life
In 2001, LoCicero and husband Michael Patrick Jann had a son, Lukas.

On June 2, 2015, LoCicero announced on her official Twitter account that she gave birth to a daughter, Verity Marion, on May 30.

Filmography

Video games

Awards and nominations

References

External links
Official Website
2004 Soap Opera Digest interview

1970 births
American film actresses
American soap opera actresses
American television actresses
Living people
20th-century American actresses
21st-century American actresses
American people of Italian descent
Actresses from Michigan
People from Grosse Pointe, Michigan